Fruitland Township may refer to:

Fruitland Township, Iowa
Fruitland Township, Michigan